{{Infobox television season
|episode_list = List of Gintama episodes
|image = File:Gintama'firstdvd.jpg
|caption = Cover of the first ''Gintama DVD, released in July 2011
| country       = Japan
| network       = TV Tokyo
|prev_season = Season 4
|next_season = Gintama': Enchōsen
|first_aired = 
|last_aired = 
|num_episodes = 51
}}
The episodes from the anime television series  are based on the Gintama manga by Hideaki Sorachi. The series premiered in TV Tokyo on April 4, 2011. It is a sequel of the first Gintama anime that ended in April 2010. The main staff from the first TV series remain in Gintama with Yoichi Fujita as the director. The story revolves around an eccentric samurai, Gintoki Sakata, his apprentice, Shinpachi Shimura, and a teenage alien girl named Kagura. All three are "freelancers" who search for work in order to pay the monthly rent, which usually goes unpaid anyway. Crunchyroll simulcasted the premiere of Gintama''' and its following episodes to subscribers from its site. The first DVD from the series was released on July 27, 2011.Gintama uses seven pieces of theme music: three openings and four endings. The first opening theme,  by Serial TV Drama, is used from episodes 1 to 26. The second opening theme,  by ecosystem, is used from episodes 27 to 39. The third opening theme, "Wonderland" by FLiP, is used from episodes 40 to 51. The first ending theme,  by SPYAIR, is used from episodes 1 to 13. The second ending theme, "Balance Doll" by Prague, is used from episodes 14 to 26. The third ending theme,  by Kuroneko Chelsea, is used from episodes 27 to 39. The fourth ending theme,  by Good Coming, is used from episode 40 to 51.



Episode list

References
General

Specific

'